Christ'l Smet (born 14 March 1961) is a Belgian windsurfer. She competed in the women's Lechner A-390 event at the 1992 Summer Olympics.

References

External links
 
 

1961 births
Living people
Belgian windsurfers
Female windsurfers
Belgian female sailors (sport)
Olympic sailors of Belgium
Sailors at the 1992 Summer Olympics – Lechner A-390
People from Willebroek
Sportspeople from Antwerp Province
20th-century Belgian women